Trinity Forest Golf Club is an 18-hole private golf club in the southern United States, located in Dallas, Texas.

Southeast of downtown Dallas, the club was founded in 2014 and the course opened for play in autumn 2016. Built on a former landfill, the treeless links-style course was designed by Bill Coore and Ben Crenshaw and features diversely architectured holes over undulating terrain.

Trinity Forest became the host course for the AT&T Byron Nelson on the PGA Tour in 2018, held in May. However, after years of declining revenue, along with other issues such as lack of entertainment and dining options in the area, the PGA Tour removed it from the 2020 schedule and moved the event to the TPC Craig Ranch when the event was revived for 2021. It is also the home of the SMU Mustangs men's and women's college golf teams.

Course

References

External links

Golf clubs and courses in Texas
Sports venues in Dallas
2014 establishments in Texas
Clubs and societies in the United States
Sports organizations established in 2014